Schrankia namibiensis is a species of moth of the family Erebidae first described by Hermann Heinrich Hacker in 2004. It is found in Namibia.

References

Moths described in 2004
Hypenodinae